Il Divo is the debut studio album to be released by classical crossover vocal group Il Divo, formed by Simon Cowell in 2004. The album was released on 1 November 2004 in the United Kingdom, via Syco Music, and on 19 April 2005 in the United States, via Columbia Records. The album contains three songs performed in English, six songs performed in Italian, and three songs performed in Spanish, excluding the bonus track. As of December 2013, the album had sold more than 1.5 million copies in the UK. The album has sold more than 5,000,000 worldwide copies to date.

Recording started in the first half of 2004 in Sweden, with producers Quiz & Larossi, Per Magnusson & David Kreuger and in the UK with producer Steve Mac. This self-titled album contained the Spanish Regresa a mí, their second single and first original song Mama; Sinatra's My Way (A mi manera); Nella Fantasia, and 1994's San Remo Festival winner Passerà.

The album hit the No. 1 slot on both Amazon.com and BarnesandNoble.com after a career-defining appearance on The Oprah Winfrey Show on 5 April 2005, where they performed Regresa a mí.

In the United Kingdom, the Il Divo album knocked Robbie Williams off the number 1 spot in the UK charts, Williams allegedly said to them at the Bridget Jones: The Edge of Reason film premiere, "So you are the four idiots who have forced me off my number one spot!"

This multiplatinum-selling CD became number one in the charts in a total of 13 countries around the world, and achieved top 5 placing in 25 countries.

Singles
 "Regresa a mí" was released as the album's lead single on 22 October 2004. The song is a cover of the original English-language version performed by R&B singer Toni Braxton, originally released in June 1996. The single remain's the band most successful single release to date. The band's Spanish version of the track received positive appreciation from critics, who said that the cover "has the potential to be a hit and to open doors for many of operas most acclaimed stars."
 "Mama" was released as the album's third single on 7 May 2005. "Mama" was the first original song ever released as a single by the band. It was released both as limited edition CD single and DVD single. It was also included on the band's live album, Live at the Greek Theatre. The songwriters behind "Mama", Andreas "Quiz" Romdhane and Josef Larossi, have contributed the largest number of original songs for the band, including "Sei parte ormai di me", "Isabel", "Si tu me amas", "Esisti dentro me" and "Una Noche". The song has also been covered and translated into other languages, including to Afrikaans by the artist Kurt Darren, and into Italian by Paul Potts.

Track listing

Charts

Weekly charts

Year-end charts

Decade-end charts

Certifications

References

External links
 

2004 debut albums
Il Divo albums
Columbia Records albums
Syco Music albums